Gears of War is a science fiction video game series.

Gears of War may also refer to:

Gears of War (video game), the first installment of the series
Gears of War (comics), a comics series based on the series
Other media named Gears of War